The Invitation is a 2015 American horror film directed by Karyn Kusama and written by Phil Hay and Matt Manfredi.  The film stars Logan Marshall-Green, Tammy Blanchard, Michiel Huisman, and Emayatzy Corinealdi. The Invitation premiered March 13, 2015, at the SXSW film festival, and began a limited release on April 8, 2016, and through video on demand, by Drafthouse Films.

Plot 

Will drives his girlfriend Kira to the Hollywood Hills home of his ex-wife Eden, who is hosting a dinner party with her new husband David. Will and Eden divorced after the accidental death of their young son Ty; Eden met David at a grief support group in Mexico. Their other dinner guests are Tommy, Tommy's boyfriend Miguel, and friends Ben, Claire, and Gina. It’s the first time this group has been together in over two years. Gina mentions that her boyfriend Choi is running late. Eden introduces Sadie, a girl she and David met in Mexico who is now staying with them.

Throughout the evening, Will wanders through his former home and relives memories, including Eden's attempted suicide. In the kitchen, Will witnesses Eden slap Ben when he makes a joke about her ideas on expelling pain. Eden and David's friend Pruitt arrives. David locks the front door, explaining that there was a home invasion in the neighborhood. Will goes outside for firewood and, through Eden's bedroom window, sees Eden hiding a pill bottle that he later learns contains the barbiturate phenobarbital.

David and Eden tell their guests about a cult-like group they joined, along with Pruitt and Sadie, called "The Invitation", which helps people work through their grief. David shows everyone a video in which the group's leader Dr. Joseph comforts a dying woman as she takes her last breaths. The guests then play a game of "I Want" in which Sadie kisses Gina, Eden kisses Ben, and Pruitt confesses to killing his wife and doing time in prison. David tries to convince an unsettled Claire not to leave, but Will challenges him. Claire leaves, accompanied by Pruitt, whose car is blocking Claire's. Will watches Pruitt take Claire out of sight to talk to her, and David confronts Will about being too suspicious.

After dinner, Will peers through a cracked door and sees Sadie make odd faces into a mirror. She makes eye contact with him, follows him outside, and startles him with an indecent proposal, which he rejects. Will talks with Tommy about the weird, unsafe atmosphere he feels at the party, but Tommy reassures him that it is natural to feel strange about visiting the house and that Will is brave for showing up. He returns to the party while Will stays outside. Will finally gets a cell phone signal and finds a voice mail from Choi indicating that he was at Eden and David's doorstep before the other guests. Presuming that David and Eden must have done something to Choi, Will angrily confronts the couple about their strange behavior and links to the cult. Choi arrives unexpectedly, explaining that he was called away by work. Will is embarrassed, but the others assume his residual grief over Ty's death is causing him to behave irrationally.

David lights a red lantern in the garden. Will finds a laptop with a foreboding message from Dr. Joseph. David and Eden pour drinks for the guests to toast, but Will smashes the glasses, fearing they are poisoned. Sadie attacks Will, who inadvertently knocks her unconscious in the scuffle. Gina, who had sipped her drink before Will's intervention, collapses and dies. David, Pruitt, and a recovered Sadie attack the guests, killing Miguel, Choi, and Ben. Will, Kira, and Tommy flee and hide in the house. Will overhears David tell Eden that they have been chosen and that finishing what they started is the only way they can leave the Earth and be free of their pain.

Tommy fatally wounds Sadie with a fireplace poker. Pruitt finds and attacks Will and Kira, who beats him to death with a wine bottle. Eden shoots Will, wounding him, then remorsefully shoots herself in the stomach. David stalks the survivors with a knife, but Tommy disarms and stabs him to death. Eden apologizes to Will and asks him to take her outside. Will, Kira, and Tommy carry the dying Eden into the garden, where they hear sirens and screams and helicopters overhead. They see more than a dozen nearby homes with red lanterns and realize that Los Angeles is erupting in chaos as other cult members carry out similar plans.

Cast

Production 
In May 2012, it was announced that Luke Wilson, Zachary Quinto, Topher Grace and Johnny Galecki had initially been scheduled to star in the film, with Karyn Kusama directing from a screenplay written by Phill Hay and Matt Manfredi, and XYZ Films producing the film alongside Martha Griffin, Manfredi and Hay. In July 2014, it was revealed that production on the film had concluded, with Logan Marshall-Green, Michiel Huisman, Emayatzy Corinealdi, Lindsay Burdge, and John Carroll Lynch starring. The Invitation is the second feature to be financed by Gamechanger Films.  Kusama was influenced by the slow reveal of Let the Right One In and the unraveling family reunion in Festen.  She cited the film's theme as "a metaphor for what the nightmare of anxiety really is, which is this irrational sense that people are trying to hurt you somehow".

Release
The film had its world premiere at South by Southwest on March 13, 2015. Shortly after, it was announced Drafthouse Films had acquired distribution rights to the film. The film went on to screen at the London Film Festival on October 9, 2015, and was released on April 8, 2016, in a limited release and through video on demand.

Reception 
The Invitation holds an 89% approval rating on review aggregator website Rotten Tomatoes based on 109 reviews, and has an average rating of 7.6/10. The critical consensus reads: "The Invitation makes brilliant use of its tension-rich premise to deliver a uniquely effective – and surprisingly clever – slow-building thriller." On Metacritic, the film holds a rating of 74 out of 100, based on 21 critics, indicating "Generally favorable reviews".

Justin Chang of Variety wrote, "This teasingly effective thriller represents director Karyn Kusama's strongest work in years."  Josh Kupecki of The Austin Chronicle said, "There are some very interesting ideas about grief, depression, and how we cope with life-changing events in this modern world, but ultimately, the film doesn't offer anything new to the 'dinner party from hell' subgenre."  Dominick Suzanne-Mayer of Consequence of Sound rated it A− and wrote, "In so many words, The Invitation is supremely well-crafted," while Samuel Zimmerman of Shock Till You Drop said, "The Invitation is a startlingly adult thriller that, unlike Eden and her guests, is willing stare down the weight our lives can bear." Peter Martin of Twitch Film intoned, "The sincerity and craft on display notwithstanding, the movie achieves a limited, unsettling level, and then stops right there," while Drew Tinnin of Dread Central rated the film 4/5 stars and wrote, "The Invitation works so well because it taps into our general distrust of the world around us and how our survival instinct has been muted and ignored in order to maintain the appearance of being polite."  Matt Donato of We Got This Covered rated the film 2.5/5 stars, writing, "The Invitation is a slow, SLOW burn that fails to find the winning ingredient that makes for a perfect dinner party thriller."  Heather Wixson of Daily Dead rated it 4.5/5 stars and called it "some of the most assuredly confident and nuanced work from [Kusama] to date and one of the most devastating horror films I’ve seen in years."

References

External links 

 
 

2015 films
2015 horror thriller films
2015 independent films
American horror thriller films
American independent films
2010s English-language films
Films about cults
Films directed by Karyn Kusama
Films produced by Matt Manfredi
Films produced by Phil Hay (screenwriter)
Films scored by Theodore Shapiro
Films set in Los Angeles
Films shot in Los Angeles
Films with screenplays by Matt Manfredi
Films with screenplays by Phil Hay (screenwriter)
Uxoricide in fiction
Films about grieving
2010s American films